Kristoffer Lou Gonzales Agoncillo (born April 10, 1979),professionally known as Ryan Agoncillo, is a Filipino actor, model, photographer, recording artist and TV host.

Career
Agoncillo started as a model at the age of fifteen, beginning as one of the early Penshoppe's Club Pen models. He has appeared in various television commercials for a variety of products such as Greenwich Pizza (together with Donita Rose), Sprite, Smart Communications, Emperador Brandy, Rexona, Swish mouthwash and McDonald's.

Agoncillo became one of the original hosts of Mornings @ GMA, an early morning variety program of GMA Network. He also hosted Campus Video, a short-lived program shown every Saturday morning at GMA Network.

He then moved to ABS-CBN and became a co-host on Talk TV, which is a morning talk show co-hosted by broadcasters Julius Babao and Christine Bersola-Babao, and actress Janette McBride. Agoncillo was briefly paired with co-host Janet McBride, because of this, Rumors spread that the two were exclusively dating for a period of time.

He also hosted Breakfast, an early morning variety program; Star in a Million, with Edu Manzano and Zsa Zsa Padilla, and Y Speak, a youth-oriented talk show and debate forum. Both shows are still aired in Studio 23, an ABS-CBN Corporation subsidiary. He won his first KBP Golden Dove Awards for his Best Talk Show host in 2005 for Studio 23's Y Speak.

Agoncillo was the main host of Philippine Idol alongside fellow ABS-CBN actress Heart Evangelista on ABC-5 (now TV5) before it was moved to GMA Network and rebooted into Pinoy Idol.

In August 2008, he began hosting TV5's Talentadong Pinoy, which showcases Filipino undiscovered talents. He also hosted Endemol's Pinoy Fear Factor which aired on ABS-CBN. Pinoy Fear Factor was shot entirely in Argentina.

On October 24, 2009, Agoncillo finally returned to GMA Network and began hosting the country's longest running noontime show, Eat Bulaga!. From April 2010 to February 2011, Agoncillo co-hosted the noontime musical variety show P.O.5 on TV5. For his hosting stints in Eat Bulaga! and Talentadong Pinoy, Agoncillo became a four-time award winner of the Aliw Award for Best Male Emcee, for which he won consecutively from 2007 to 2010. In 2010, he was elevated to the Hall of Fame. Agoncillo hosted a game show called Picture! Picture! which premiered on November 23, 2013, on GMA Network, the show aired for 28 weeks ending on June 15, 2014. In 2015, Agoncillo was announced as the host of Cash Cab Philippines, the Philippine edition of the game show format Cash Cab. The show would go on to air 13 episodes on AXN Asia from December 22.

From 2020 to 2021, he was the director of the documentary show Paano Kita Mapasasalamatan? hosted by his wife Judy Ann Santos, marking his partial return to ABS-CBN despite his commitments to other networks.

Acting
Agoncillo joined the talent cast of ABS-CBN. He is most memorable for playing the love interest of Judy Ann Santos in the television soap opera Krystala. He once again appeared with Santos in the movie Kasal, Kasali, Kasalo. He received best actor nominations from different award-giving bodies for his portrayal of a confused newly wed husband in this film. He will be doing a new movie with Judy Ann Santos called Mr. Housewife.

He also played a main cast role in Bituing Walang Ningning, an ABS-CBN soap opera featuring singer-actresses Sarah Geronimo, Angelika dela Cruz, and Zsa Zsa Padilla in the leads.

Agoncillo also played leading roles in independent film projects and television drama shows. He played the distinct roles of a grease-filled beggar and a transvestite in two separate dramatic episodes of Maalaala Mo Kaya, the biographical drama series of ABS-CBN.

He starred in the ABS-CBN television series, Ysabella with his long-time on-screen partner, Judy Ann Santos.

Agoncillo returns to acting on TV with drama series entitled Pieta airing weekly days afternoons over ABS-CBN where he portrayed Rigor, a character originally portrayed by Ace Vergel.

Agoncillo returns to acting again for his new role in May Bukas Pa where he plays a media cameraman in the final 10 episodes of the series (254–263, aired January 25–February 5, 2010) after his wife Judy Ann Santos also guested in the show (episodes 237–241, aired December 31, 2009 – January 6, 2010).

Agoncillo appeared in Lady Dada on TV5 in 2010.

Agoncillo returned to acting again this time on GMA Network with My Husband's Lover as his very first television series on the network appearing in a minor role (also in a last week of the drama series), with his co-stars Carla Abellana and Dennis Trillo in 2013, and in Ismol Family from 2014 to 2016, also with Carla Abellana.

Personal life
Agoncillo married actress Judy Ann Santos in a private wedding on April 28, 2009, at the San Juan de Nepomuceno Church in San Juan, Batangas, Philippines. Now the couple have three children.

Photography
Agoncillo had a one-man colored photo exhibit at Glorietta, sponsored by Fujifilm in 2007. He published a black-and-white photography coffeetable book titled "Ploning – the Making" as a birthday gift to his fiancée Judy Ann Santos in 2008.

Motoring
Agoncillo is a motorcycle enthusiast. He is also into drifting. He competes in various drifting events with a Nissan Silvia (S13) sponsored by Adidas, Yellow Cab Pizza, Shell and Nexen Tire.

Filmography

Film

Television

Discography

Albums

Songs
 "I'll Have to Say I Love You in a Song"
 "Ikaw ang Pag-ibig"

Awards and recognitions
 "Anak TV Seal Award" – 2010 with wife Judy Ann Santos
 Winner, Male Star of the Night – 2009 MTRCB TV Awards
 Winner, German Moreno Youth Achievement Award 2008 – FAMAS Awards Night 2008
 Winner, Best Public Affairs Program Host "Y-Speak" – 2007 KBP Golden Dove Awards

References

External links

 

1979 births
Living people
Filipino male television actors
Filipino television variety show hosts
Filipino game show hosts
De La Salle University alumni
People from Santa Mesa
Male actors from Manila
People from Batangas
21st-century Filipino male actors
ABS-CBN personalities
GMA Integrated News and Public Affairs people
GMA Network personalities
Filipino male film actors
Filipino people of Spanish descent